Kane Ruudi Hemmings (born 8 April 1992) is an English professional footballer who plays for League Two club Tranmere Rovers. He has previously played for Tamworth, Rangers, Cowdenbeath, Dundee (twice), Barnsley, Oxford United, Mansfield Town, Notts County and Burton Albion.

Career
Hemmings had trials at Midlands clubs, including Derby County and Birmingham City. At aged 13 he moved from playing in the Burton and District Football League to Tamworth, where he won top goal scorer award in the 2006–07 season.

Rangers
After three successful years with Tamworth, Hemmings signed a two-year contract with Rangers in 2008. He progressed through the reserve and youth squads, appearing in three Scottish Youth Cup Finals, and captained the under-19 team. He signed a new contract with the club in December 2010.

He appeared in the first-team squad as an unused substitute occasionally during the 2010–11 season. Hemmings made his first on-field appearance in the UEFA Champions League qualifier against Malmö FF on 3 August 2011 in which Rangers were beaten 2–1 on aggregate. After the 2011–12 season, Rangers entered administration, then were liquidated and many players consequently departed, Hemmings was among those who stayed, and attended training in late June. Hemmings suffered a knee injury that would rule him out for five months after surgery. On suffering the injury he said he expected to be in the first team once he got back fit.

After being recalled by Rangers, he made his first appearance for the club on 2 March 2013, coming on as a substitute for Lee McCulloch in the 87th minute, as Rangers won 3–1 against East Stirlingshire. Three weeks later, on 24 March 2013, Hemmings made his first start, as a lone striker, against Stirling Albion. During the match, he missed several chances to get his first goal for the club. On 7 April, he scored his first Rangers goal, coming on as a second-half substitute for Anestis Argyriou at Hampden Park and curling a shot in from the edge of the box after a pass by David Templeton, as Rangers won 4–1 against Queen's Park. On 21 June 2013 it was announced that Hemmings would be leaving Rangers at the end of his current contract.

Cowdenbeath
Upon returning from injury, Hemmings left Rangers to join Cowdenbeath on loan until the end of January. The day after joining the club, he made his debut, in a 1–1 draw against Greenock Morton. On 12 January 2013, Hemmings scored for Cowdenbeath against Hamilton Academical in a 2–1 defeat for the Fife outfit and then scored four goals in four consecutive games. He agreed to extend his loan until the end of February after the club asked Rangers and he also believed his loan spell at Cowdenbeath would earn him a first-team place back at Rangers. After two months at Cowdenbeath, Hemmings returned to Rangers after being recalled.

After being released by Rangers, Hemmings signed a one-year deal with Cowdenbeath and was given the number 21 shirt. On 27 April 2014, Hemmings was named as PFA Scotland Championship Player of the Year for 2013–14. He was also selected to the 2013–14 Championship PFA Scotland's Team of the Year. Hemmings scored 18 goals for Cowdenbeath, including the winning goal in the second leg of the relegation final against League One second-place team Dunfermline to help the club avoid relegation.

Following the season, he travelled to the United States for a trial with Orlando City. This came after Hemmings was linked with moves to Dundee, and Dunfermline Athletic.

Barnsley
On 19 June 2014, Hemmings signed a one-year contract with League One side Barnsley on a free transfer. The move was disputed, with Cowdenbeath demanding compensation, as Hemmings was under 23 at the time.

Having missed the first two matches due to an injury, Hemmings made his Barnsley debut on 19 August 2014, coming on as substitute for Sam Winnall in the last minutes, as Barnsley drew 2–2 with Coventry City. He scored his first Barnsley goal in the first round of the Football League Trophy, in a 2–0 win over York City on 2 September 2014. It took until 12 October 2014 for Hemmings to score his first Barnsley league goal, in a 3–1 win over Bradford City. Hemmings then scored his first FA Cup goal, in a replay, in a 3–0 win over Chester on 16 December 2014. His second league goal of the season came in a 1–0 win over Oldham Athletic on 3 February 2015, and his third on 14 February 2015 in a 5–1 loss against Crawley Town.

After one season at Barnsley, having made 29 appearances and scored five times in all competitions, Hemmings was among seven players released by the club.

Dundee
Hemmings signed a pre-contract agreement with Dundee on 16 May 2015 and joined the Scottish club on 1 July, on a three-year deal. Hemmings started the season very well at one point having scored 12 goals in 10 games, including a goal in a 2–1 victory over Dundee United F.C. in the Dundee derby, this form had the striker linked with a £2M move to Chinese side Beijing Renhe as well as being recommended for a call up to the Jamaica national team by Liverpool Legend John Barnes. He scored 21 league goals with an additional 4 goals to reach 25 goals in all competitions in his first season, and was named as SPFL Player of the Month for January 2016 as well as earning a nomination for PFA Player of the Year. Despite scoring 21 league goals Hemmings missed out on the SPFL player of the year and SPFL Golden Boot to Leigh Griffiths who had a remarkable season netting 40 goals for League Champions Celtic.

A release clause in Hemmings's contract saw him sold for far less than his valuation from the club who ideally valued the striker for a 7 figure sum. Hemmings was sold before the league season had started but still found form in the group stage of the Scottish League Cup, scoring 3 goals in 2 games.

Oxford United
On 27 July 2016, Hemmings signed for Oxford United for an undisclosed six-figure fee, believed to be in the region of £250,000. He agreed a three-year contract with his new club. After two substitute appearances in league and cup, he scored his first goal for the club on his full debut, the only Oxford goal in a 2–1 defeat by Bristol Rovers in a League One fixture.

On 22 August 2017 he joined Mansfield Town on a season-long loan.

At the end of the season Oxford announced Hemmings' transfer to Notts County for an undisclosed fee.

Notts County
On 1 June 2018, Hemmings signed for Notts County on a three-year contract for a fee of approximately £100,000 (two years with the club having the option for a third term). Whilst having success on the scoring sheet in his one season with the Magpies, the club would find themselves relegated out of the Football League and in a very poor financial position. Due to this financial situation, County decided to take offers from others on Hemmings, despite being only one year into his contract.

Dundee (second spell)
On 8 August 2019, Hemmings made his return to Dundee on a free transfer, signing a three-year deal with his former club. In a season that finished early due to the COVID-19 pandemic, Hemmings was top scorer for the Dark Blues, netting 10 goals in all competitions. After the club began negotiations to cut player wages in response to the financial hardships posed by COVID-19, Hemmings was the only player to not agree before 12 July. Hemmings reportedly agreed a wage cut, but eventually reneged and departed the club by mutual consent on 5 August 2020.

Burton Albion
On 12 August 2020, Hemmings signed for Burton Albion, on a two-year deal, following his departure from Dundee.

Tranmere Rovers
On 13 January 2022, Hemmings joined EFL League Two side Tranmere Rovers on a two and a half year deal, for an undisclosed fee.

Personal life
Hemmings is the son of former professional footballer Tony Hemmings.

In an interview with The Guardian in February 2021, Hemmings detailed his struggles with mental health and anxiety throughout his career, including thoughts of suicide. He expressed the benefit of seeking help had done for him, and encouraged others going through similar struggles to get help.

Career statistics

Honours
Oxford United
EFL Trophy runner-up: 2016–17

References

External links

1991 births
Living people
Sportspeople from Burton upon Trent
Tamworth F.C. players
Rangers F.C. players
English footballers
Association football forwards
Scottish Premier League players
Scottish Football League players
Cowdenbeath F.C. players
Scottish Professional Football League players
Barnsley F.C. players
English Football League players
Dundee F.C. players
Oxford United F.C. players
Notts County F.C. players
Tranmere Rovers F.C. players
Burton Albion F.C. players
English people of Jamaican descent